Stroitel Stadium may refer to

 Stroitel Stadium (Dimitrovgrad), Russia
 Stroitel Stadium (Murmansk), Russia
 Stroitel Stadium (Soligorsk), Belarus